Swen Michaelis (born 31 March 1981) is a German wheelchair rugby player and former Paralympic swimmer. He was a two-time Paralympic medalist and a World champion in swimming. He now competes in Germany national wheelchair rugby team.

References

External links
 

1981 births
Living people
German male freestyle swimmers
German male medley swimmers
S6-classified Paralympic swimmers
Paralympic swimmers of Germany
Paralympic wheelchair rugby players
Swimmers at the 2000 Summer Paralympics
Swimmers at the 2004 Summer Paralympics
Swimmers at the 2008 Summer Paralympics
Swimmers at the 2012 Summer Paralympics
Medalists at the 2000 Summer Paralympics
Medalists at the 2004 Summer Paralympics
Medalists at the World Para Swimming Championships
Sportspeople from Chemnitz
Swimmers from Leipzig
21st-century German people